Ryan Jerome McCartan (born June 14, 1993) is an American actor and singer. As an actor, he is known for playing Jason "J.D." Dean in the original off-Broadway production of Heathers: The Musical (2014) and for playing Brad Majors in the 2016 Fox musical television film The Rocky Horror Picture Show: Let's Do the Time Warp Again. McCartan is also known as half of the former pop duo The Girl and the Dreamcatcher. McCartan played the recurring role of Diggie Smalls on the Disney Channel sitcom Liv and Maddie. Further Broadway credits include Fiyero in Wicked and Hans in Frozen.

Early life 

McCartan was born in Excelsior, Minnesota. His father, Conn McCartan, was the principal at Eden Prairie High School in Eden Prairie, Minnesota.

Career 
McCartan began his career with a minor part in the stage version of Disney's High School Musical in 2007. In 2011 he starred in the titular role in Minnesota's first regional production of The Phantom of the Opera. That same year, he won Best Performance by an Actor at the Jimmy Awards, given out by The Broadway League to the top performers in high school musical productions. 
McCartan also originated the role of Jason Dean in the original off-Broadway cast of the musical Heathers, which ran from March through August 2014, after playing the role in the Los Angeles tryout in 2013. 

In 2013, McCartan began playing the recurring role of Diggie on the Disney Channel comedy Liv and Maddie. In 2015 he starred in the direct-to-video film R.L. Stine's Monsterville: Cabinet of Souls. In 2016 McCartan was cast in the lead role of Brad Majors in the 2016 Fox musical television film The Rocky Horror Picture Show: Let's Do the Time Warp Again.

In May 2015, Dove Cameron announced that she and McCartan were officially forming a pop duo and would be releasing their first original song. In September 2015, they announced their group's name would be The Girl and the Dreamcatcher, and their first video was released in October 2015. The pair broke up in October 2016.

On September 11, 2018, McCartan made his Broadway debut as Fiyero in the musical Wicked. He remained with the show through May 12, 2019. In mid-2018 he originated the lead role of Eddie Corbin in the new musical Mutt House at the Kirk Douglas Theatre, and in August 2019 he played Lt. Cable in South Pacific at the Aspen Music Festival. In 2019,  starred in the role of Mac in the Roundabout Theatre Company's new musical Scotland PA. In November 2019 he made his solo show debut at Feinstein's/54 Below. In April 2020, he hosted the Broadway Cares/Equity Fights AIDS viewing of 25 Years of Disney Broadway.

He joined the cast of Frozen on Broadway as Hans in February 2020 opposite McKenzie Kurtz as Anna and Ciara Renée as Elsa. However, due to the ongoing COVID-19 pandemic, all Broadway theatres were closed. Disney later announced, on May 14, 2020, that Frozen would not reopen after the lifting of the lockdown. During 2022, he played Hans in the Broadway National tour of Frozen for two runs, with his final performance being September 4, 2022. His first run would reunite him with Kurtz, his Broadway Anna.

Personal life 
McCartan began dating actress and singer Dove Cameron who was his Liv & Maddie co-star in August 2013. McCartan was 20 years at that time and Dove Cameron was 17 years old. He officially announced that Cameron was his fiancée on April 14, 2016, but the relationship ended in October 2016. Since October 2017, he has been dating Samantha Fekete with whom he runs a YouTube channel called Sam & Ryan.

On July 29, 2014, McCartan revealed in a tweet that he has had diabetes since age six. In 2019, McCartan stated in an interview that he had been sexually abused by a theatre mentor when he was 12. When asked by a fan on an Instagram live if he would ever have a relationship with a man, McCartan responded, "Fuck yeah I would. ... Love is love. Period. I've been with men."

Filmography

Theater credits

Discography

Studio albums

Soundtrack albums

Extended plays

Singles

Promotional singles

Other appearances

Music videos

Awards
In 2011, he received a Jimmy Award for Best Performance by an Actor.

References

External links 

1993 births
Living people
People from Excelsior, Minnesota
American male television actors
21st-century American male actors
21st-century American singers
21st-century American male singers
LGBT people from Minnesota